Anna Tronds  (c. 1540–1607), known in English as Anna Throndsen and posthumously as Anna Rustung, was a Dano-Norwegian noblewoman. In English and Scots history, Anna Throndsen is best known for her marriage to James Hepburn, 4th Earl of Bothwell (which later earned her the nickname Skottefruen ("The Scottish Lady")), a man who later married Mary, Queen of Scots. Anna Throndsen is also known for her possible but much debated and disputed involvement in drafting some of the famous Casket Letters; these letters being the principal evidence against Mary.

Background

Anna was the eldest daughter of Kristoffer Throndsen, a famous 16th-century Norwegian admiral, nobleman and wartime privateer (pirate).  During the final years of independent Norway, 1532–1537, Kristoffer served as admiral of the Norwegian fleet, in the service of his cousin, Olav Engelbrektsson, the last archbishop of Norway.  Some years after Norway's political subsumption by Denmark, in 1542-43, Kristoffer was appointed to serve King Christian III as a Naval commander.  He served as an admiral in the Danish-Norwegian fleet, then as Danish Royal Consul in Copenhagen.  Kristoffer took his Norwegian family, including Anna, to Copenhagen at this time.  As a young woman, Anna assisted her father in consular affairs in the Danish-Norwegian capital.

Anna had a sister, Else, who married a Shetland man Andrew Mowat of Hugoland in Eshaness. They lived in Norway and had a son Axel Mowat. Else owned a small property in Shetland, mentioned in a 1597 document written in Norn.

Marriage to James Hepburn, Earl of Bothwell

Anna was married to Bothwell, by handfasting, while he was doing business in Denmark.  The marriage was considered legitimate under Dano-Norwegian law, but was, and is still, treated as dubious or invalid, by English and Scots historians. For this reason, most English books refer to her, incorrectly, as a "mistress", or jilted lover.  Anna's later Bergen lawsuit against Bothwell (ca. 1570), which held him to account for wrongful behaviour as a husband, as well as writings of the Scots Earl of Moray, lend credence to the fact that a marriage did transpire.

A notorious scoundrel, Bothwell married another woman, Lady Jean Gordon, in France, shortly after marrying her, and soon set his eyes on the Queen, Mary Stuart.  While in Scotland, Anna was frustrated and unhappy.  She was rumoured to have borne a child, this possibly being William, the only son of Bothwell.  In the mid-1560s, she left Scotland to return to her family; her mother and siblings had returned to Norway on her father's death.  Shortly thereafter, Bothwell proceeded to marry Mary Stuart, Queen of Scots, after having allegedly murdered her husband, Henry Stuart, Lord Darnley.

Bothwell met his demise through a chance reunion with Anna in Bergen, Norway.  He had left Scotland, fleeing the authorities seeking him on murder charges related to the death of Darnley.  He was detained in the port of Bergen, Norway for lack of proper exit papers.  Anna was now living in Bergen, where she had family connections.  Bothwell's administrative detainment turned to imprisonment in Rosenkrantz Tower on the order of Anna's cousin, Danish Viceroy Erik Rosenkratz, on the basis of Anna's legal complaint against him for his use of her as his wife, and demand for restitution of her sizable dowry.  A court case ensued, whereby she gave testimony putting forth that he had "three wives alive" including herself.

Bothwell settled with Anna out of court, offering her as restitution one of his ships and promising her an additional annuity which he never was able to pay, as he never regained his freedom.  The King of Denmark-Norway, Fredrik II had taken notice of him as a political pawn.  Elizabeth I was calling for Bothwell's extradition back to Scotland to stand trial for the murder of Darnley, Elizabeth's cousin. Rather than turn him over to England, Fredrik II transferred Bothwell to Dragsholm Castle where he died after many years.

Possible involvement with the Casket Letters

Anna Throndsen has been connected with a set of correspondence called the Casket Letters. These letters which were found in the belongings of a servant of Bothwell, after his flight from Scotland.  These letters were used by Mary's half-brother Regent Moray to demonstrate her involvement in the murder of her husband, Lord Darnley. The letters include sonnets and poetry. Some of this material is supposed to have been written by Anna, an idea first suggested by the novelist Robert Gore Browne in his 1937 study of Bothwell.  Most British historians contest this, alleging that someone of Nordic nobility would not have had sufficient knowledge of French to draft such prose and there is no reason to connect Throndsen with the Scottish court of Mary or her enemies.  Handwriting analysis has also led to dismissal of this speculation. Handwriting analysis may not take into consideration the international background of the family, which regularly moved throughout Europe during her childhood, and being nobility would have spoken fluent French, or that the letters exist mostly as copies.

Skottefruen

Anna Throndsen is known in modern Norway as Skottefruen, "the Scottish Lady".  This was a name attributed to Anna during her lifetime, after return from Scotland, to the Bergen, Norway area, where her family had several residences.

She never remarried.  She was, however, socially active and prominent in local events and social affairs, such as is recorded in various historical diaries from the period.  Evidently she was wealthy in her own right, due to some good investments of her inheritance.  She is said to have spent her last days in Utstein Abbey, a converted former-convent outside of Stavanger.  It is understood that she became a nun late in life; if so, this would have been indicative of her family's Catholic background. Her father had been a cousin of the last Norwegian archbishop, Olav Engelbrektsson.

Several historical novels have been written about her as Skottefruen, in the Norwegian language; these used temporal journals and diaries as reference.

References

16th-century Scottish women
1540s births
1607 deaths
16th-century Norwegian nobility
17th-century Norwegian nobility
Norwegian expatriates in Scotland
16th-century Norwegian women